Mawuko Girls' High school, Ghana, is an educational institution for girls founded by the late Reverend Professor Noah Komla Dzobo of the Evangelical Presbyterian Church, Ghana.

History 
The school was established in 1983 and gained the status of a Boarding School in 1997. Courses taught include Business, Home Economics, Visual Arts and Performing Arts. Ms. Janet Kwasi was Headmistress of the school as of 2014. The school is the second senior high school for girls in Ho, the capital city of the Volta region and maintains the motto, "Educate a woman for God and educate a whole nation for God."

Programs Offered 

 Business
 Agriculture
 Home Economics
 Visual Arts
 General Arts
 General Science

Notable alumnae
 Emefa Akosua Adeti, Ghanaian model and television personality 
 Selase Agbenyefia, first Ghanaian female helicopter pilot
 Victoria Michaels, model, fashion icon, actress, brand ambassador and philanthropist

References

High schools in Ghana
Boarding schools in Ghana
Girls' schools in Ghana
Education in Volta Region
Educational institutions established in 1983
1983 establishments in Ghana